Thạnh Phú is commune-level town and capital of Thạnh Phú District in Bến Tre Province in the Mekong Delta region of Vietnam. As of 1999 it has 10,331 citizens and covers an area of 11.39 km².

References

Populated places in Bến Tre province
District capitals in Vietnam
Townships in Vietnam